"Secret Tournament" (also known as "Scorpion KO" or "The Cage") was a Nike global advertising campaign coinciding with the 2002 FIFA World Cup. With a marketing budget estimated at US$100 million, the advert featured 24 top contemporary football players and former player Eric Cantona as the tournament "referee". It was directed by film director and Monty Python member Terry Gilliam.

Campaign instalments
The campaign started in March 2002 with the "tease" phase of the campaign, featuring only a shot of football boots and a scorpion. The early ads led viewers to a website where they could learn more about the Secret Tournament and play interactive games.

April saw the start of the "Excite" phase, with the teams facing off against each other, then moved into the "Involve" phase (see Impact).

Synopsis
The concept of the advertising campaign was a fictional tournament involving eight teams of three of football's top players in a first-goal-wins elimination. The matches were staged in an enclosed pitch located on a ship with former footballer Eric Cantona acting in the role of referee.

Besides the TV advertising campaign, the marketing strategy involved the execution of local tournaments in several major capital cities of the world, being held in schools, sport venues and stadiums. The concept was the same: teams of three players had to be registered and one-goal matches were played in successive knock-out rounds up to the final matches in cages like the ones in the TV ads.

Players

Bracket

Edits
There are several different edits of the "Scorpion KO" commercials. There are four separate commercials for each match as well as an overall compilation of the matches and a condensed version of the compilation.

Soundtrack
The song in the advertisement was a new remix of Elvis Presley's "A Little Less Conversation", remixed by Junkie XL (JXL). Following its appearance, the remix was released as the single "A Little Less Conversation" by "Elvis vs. JXL". The single cover featured both the logo for Scorpion KO and Nike's Swoosh logo. The song went on to become a Number 1 hit in over 20 countries. In the UK, it was one of two songs to reach number 1 off the success of an advert in the 2000s, followed by Room 5's "Make Luv" the following year. The remix later became the sole single from Presley's multi-million-selling hits album ELV1S: 30 No. 1 Hits.

Rematch
Following the run of the original advert, it was quickly followed up by a "Rematch" advert, featuring the two teams from the original final. In this script, the two teams played on a set representing the interior hull of the ship, no longer within a cage, and scored goals by hitting the bulkheads within a painted-on rectangle. Furthermore, as there were now only two teams remaining, the target was now to reach 100 goals. The two teams were said to have reached 99–99, meaning that the next goal would win; however, the previous 198 goals and other errant shots meant that the rivets holding the ship together had weakened, so when Luís Figo scored the winning goal for Os Tornados, there was a hull breach, water rushed in and the two teams had to swim for shore.

Impact
Following the airing of the commercials, in June 2002 an estimated 1–2 million children under the age of 16 competed in matches following the Scorpion KO rules in several major cities worldwide, including London (in the Millennium Dome), Beijing, Mexico City (in the then existent Toreo de Cuatro Caminos dome), Buenos Aires, Montevideo, Los Angeles, Madrid, Paris, Rotterdam, Santiago, São Paulo, Seoul, Tokyo, Berlin and Rome.

Nike considered the campaign a success, with Nike president Mark Parker commenting, "This spring's integrated football marketing initiative was the most comprehensive and successful global campaign ever executed by Nike."

References

External links
Dreams: Gilliam's 2002 Nike ad

Advertising campaigns
American television commercials
2000s television commercials
Works by Terry Gilliam
Nike Inc. advertising